This is a list of Grey Cup winning head coaches.

Head Coaches with multiple Grey Cup wins
{| class="wikitable sortable"  style="font-size: 95%; text-align:center"
|-
! Head Coach
! Wins
! Years won
! Team(s)
|-
|Lew Hayman
|5
|1933, 1937, 1938, 1942, 1949
|Toronto Argonauts, Toronto RCAF Hurricanes, Montreal Alouettes
|-
|Frank Clair
|5
|1950, 1952, 1960, 1968, 1969
|Toronto Argonauts, Ottawa Roughriders
|-
|Hugh Campbell
|5
|1978, 1979, 1980, 1981, 1982
|Edmonton Eskimos
|- 
|Don Matthews
|5
|1985, 1995, 1996, 1997, 2002
|BC Lions, Baltimore Stallions, Toronto Argonauts, Montreal Alouettes
|-
|Wally Buono
|5
|1992, 1998, 2001, 2006, 2011
|Calgary Stampeders, BC Lions
|-
|Billy Hughes 
|4
|1922, 1923, 1924, 1932
|Queen's University, Hamilton Tigers
|-
|Bud Grant
|4
|1958, 1959, 1961, 1962
|Winnipeg Blue Bombers
|-
|Liz Marriott
|3
|1912, 1913, 1915
|Hamilton Alerts, Hamilton Tigers
|-
|Teddy Morris
|3
|1945, 1946, 1947
|Toronto Argonauts
|-
|Pop Ivy
|3
|1954, 1955, 1956
|Edmonton Eskimos
|-
|Ralph Sazio
|3
|1963, 1965, 1967
|Hamilton Tiger-Cats
|-
|Marc Trestman
|3
|2009, 2010, 2017
|Montreal Alouettes,Toronto Argonauts
|-
|Harry Griffith
|2
|1909, 1910
|University of Toronto
|-
|Dave McCann
|2
|1925, 1926
|Ottawa Senators
|-
|Mike Rodden
|2
|1928, 1929
|Hamilton Tigers
|-
|Art Massucci
|2
|1934, 1936
|Sarnia Imperials
|-
|Red Threlfall 
|2
|1939, 1941
|Winnipeg Blue Bombers
|-
|Marv Levy
|2
|1974, 1977
|Montreal Alouettes
|-
|Mike Riley
|2
|1988, 1990
|Winnipeg Blue Bombers
|-
|Ron Lancaster 
|2
|1993, 1999
|Edmonton Eskimos, Hamilton Tiger-Cats
|-
|John Hufnagel
|2
|2008, 2014
|Calgary Stampeders
|-
|Mike O'Shea
|2
|2019, 2021
|Winnipeg Blue Bombers

head coach